Muhamad Chatib "Dede" Basri is an Indonesian economist and was the Minister of Finance in the Second United Indonesia Cabinet between 21 May 2013 and 20 October 2014 when the term of the administration of the Susilo Bambang Yudhoyono was completed.  Before his appointment as Minister of Finance he was chair of the Indonesian Investment Coordinating Board (Badan Kordinasi Penanaman Modal, or BKPM).

He served in a number of senior economic advisory positions before being appointed as chair of the Investment Coordinating Board in 2011.  He was, amongst other things, an advisor to the former Indonesian Minister of Finance Sri Mulyani Indrawati and Deputy Chair of the president's Economic National Committee (Komite Ekonomi Nasional, or KEN) and was Sherpa to the president of Indonesia for G-20 meetings

Basri has a PhD from the Australian National University.  He also teaches in the Faculty of Economics at the University of Indonesia (FEUI) and was Director of the Lembaga Penyelidikan Ekonomi dan Masyarakat (Institute for Economic and Social Research, or LPEM) within the FEUI and Ash Centre Senior Fellow at the Harvard Kennedy School 2015–2016.  He was also a fellow at the Centre on Global Transformation University of California at San Diego He is now a member of  The World Bank Advisory Council on Gender and Development']. and also member of the Advisory Board of Centre for Applied Macroeconomic Analysis at the Australian National University.

Dede Basri's areas of expertise include international trade, macroeconomics, and political economy. As an academic economist he has published in various economic journals such as World Economy, Asian Economic Papers, and the Bulletin of Indonesian Economic Studies.  He has also been a Thee Kian Wie Distinguished Visiting Professor at the Australian National University  and adjunct fellow in the Arndt-Corden Department of Economics at the Australian National University. Dr.Basri is also a member of Group of Eminent Personalities of the OECD Development Centre

References

Finance Ministers of Indonesia
1965 births
Living people
Indonesian Muslims
Government ministers of Indonesia
20th-century Indonesian economists
Australian National University alumni
Politicians from Jakarta
21st-century Indonesian economists